Dan Finnerty (born January 22, 1970) is an American actor and singer.

Early life
Finnerty was born in Rochester, New York, and grew up in the small town of Bath, New York. He attended Emerson College in Boston. He was a member of the hit off-Broadway show Stomp in New York City.

Career
He is the lead singer of the cult hit comedy group he created called The Dan Band, which Entertainment Weekly dubbed "the hottest ticket in Hollywood."  The live show was filmed in Los Angeles as a one-hour concert special Dan Finnerty & The Dan Band: I Am Woman on the Bravo channel, directed by McG and executive produced by Steven Spielberg.

Finnerty gained fame for his hilariously foul-mouthed rendition of "Total Eclipse of the Heart" as the wedding singer at Will Ferrell's wedding in the movie Old School, directed by Todd Phillips. Phillips continued to feature Dan, as the sleazy bat-mitzvah singer in Starsky & Hutch and again as the irreverent wedding singer in  The Hangover.
After seeing The Dan Band, Steven Spielberg cast him in The Terminal and signed on to executive produce his comedy special.

Finnerty originated the role of Lonny in the world premiere of "Rock of Ages" in Los Angeles along with Kyle Gass from Tenacious D and made a cameo appearance in the film version of "Rock of Ages" as the tour manager for Stacee Jaxx played by Tom Cruise.

He appeared over 15 times as a comedy correspondent on "The Jay Leno Show" and The Tonight Show with Jay Leno.

"The Dan Band" has released three albums:

The Dan Band Live, the full-length CD of his live show released by Side One Dummy Records.

Ho. A Dan Band Xmas, featuring all original holiday songs, with videos for "I Wanna Rock U Hard This Christmas" featuring Florence Henderson from The Brady Bunch making the moves on Santa at a retirement home, as well as the anthemic  "Please Don't Bomb Nobody This Holiday," featuring celebrity cameos including Sheryl Crow, Christina Applegate, Nicole Scherzinger, Kyle Gass from Tenacious D, Neil Patrick Harris, Meg Ryan, Donald Faison, Macy Gray, Christopher Guest, Cheri Oteri, Rachael Harris, Kathy Najimy, Nia Vardalos, Ian Gomez, Nathan Fillion, Ricki Lake, Michael Johns, Janeane Garofalo, Lauren Tom, Gia Carides and Matthew Perry.

The Wedding Album, released 2015 through Comedy Dynamics includes collaborations with Nicole Scherzinger, Rob Thomas, Bridget Everett, Nuno Bettencourt and TRAIN.

The Dan Band appeared numerous times on The Tonight Show with Jay Leno, Jimmy Kimmel Live!, The Late Late Show, Last Call with Carson Daly''' and as the house band on The Ellen DeGeneres Show, Pajama Party, and Spike TV's Spike Guys' Choice Awards. Finnerty also wrote and performed the finale song for the final season of Last Comic Standing.

In March 2017, AT&T announced that Finnerty would appear in advertisements for DIRECTV during March Madness, co-starring with Greg Gumbel. The spots feature Finnerty performing the Aerosmith song "I Don't Want to Miss a Thing", with lyrics tailored to each scene (generally people at work while tournament games are on).

He recently appeared in the Netflix film Dumplin''' starring Jennifer Aniston as pageant host Eugene Reed, performing the song "Look At Her" which he co-wrote with American Idol musical director Michael Orland.

Personal life
In August 1998, he married actress Kathy Najimy, with Gloria Steinem officiating the ceremony. The couple has one daughter, musician Samia, born December 1996.

Filmography

Film

Television

References

External links

 
 The Dan Band official site

American male film actors
Emerson College alumni
Living people
Male actors from Rochester, New York
Comedy rock
1970 births
People from Bath, New York
Musicians from Rochester, New York
21st-century American singers
21st-century American male singers